The Rural Pie Scheme was organised by the Ministry of Food to provide pies for labourers in the countryside who did not have access to a works canteen or British Restaurant.  It started in 1942.

References

 1942 establishments in the United Kingdom
Austerity in the United Kingdom (1939–1954)
 Public policy in the United Kingdom
 United Kingdom home front during World War II